Hospital Pharmacy of North Norway Trust is a health trust owned by Northern Norway Regional Health Authority that operates six hospital pharmacies. The pharmacies are part of the Ditt Apotek chain and use Norsk Medisinaldepot as wholesaler.

The pharmacies are located at Tromsø University Hospital, Bodø Hospital, Harstad Hospital, Narvik Hospital, Lofoten Hospital and Stokmarknes Hospital.

Pharmacies of Norway
Retail companies of Norway
Health trusts of Norway
Norwegian companies established in 2002
Companies based in Tromsø